Sho't is the Israeli designation of the 105 mm L7 armed Centurion tank, which entered Israeli service in the late 1960s.

Versions

Sho't Meteor 
The Sho't Meteor is a Centurion tank with the original Rolls-Royce Meteor petrol engine.

Sho't Kal Alef/Bet/Gimel/Dalet 
The Shot Kal is a modernised Centurion tank with a new powerpack (the Continental AVDS-1790-2A diesel engine and the Allison CD850-6 transmission). The addition "Kal" refers to the abbreviation of the engine manufacturer Continental, originally notated in Hebrew as "שוטקל" and transliterated as "sho'tqal".

The Kal entered service in 1970, and by 1974 all Israeli Centurions and Sho't Meteor were upgraded to Sho't Kal. Subvariants indicate upgrades received by Sho't Kal tanks during their operational life, including a new turret rotating mechanism, a new gun stabilizer, a new fire-control system and preparations for the installation of the Blazer reactive armour.

Combat history

The Sho't tank served in the Six-Day War in 1967 and the Yom Kippur war in 1973; one of them, belonging to the 188th Armored Brigade, was operated by Captain Zvika Greengold, an Israeli tank ace. However, as all tanks in the opening days of the 1973 Yom Kippur war, it proved exceedingly vulnerable to Soviet-made weapons such as the RPG-2, RPG-7, and briefcase Sagger guided missile, weapons which the Egyptians used in large numbers in the crossing of the Bar Lev line. It is estimated that the Israeli armed forces lost up to 40% of their southern armored groups during the first two days of the war, highlighting the necessity for infantry support to armoured groups, culminating in the Merkava main battle tanks being equipped with rear troop bays.

The Sho't was also used in the 1978 and 1982 invasions of Lebanon.

See also
Nagmasho't / Nagmachon / Nakpadon – Israeli heavy armoured personnel carriers based on Centurion tank's chassis.
Puma armored engineering vehicle – Israeli combat engineering vehicle on Centurion tank chassis.
Centurion tank – British tank from which the Sho't is derived.

References

Tanks of the Cold War
Main battle tanks of Israel
Military vehicles introduced in the 1960s